Khalid Hameed Baig is a Pakistani newscaster who worked at Radio Pakistan and Pakistan Television during the 1970s and 1980s. Currently, he is associated with Voice of  America (Urdu).

Life and career
Hameed was born in Rawalpindi. He joined Pakistan Television as a news presenter in February 1972. According to a Gallup survey in 1986, he was the most popular male PTV newscaster.

Currently, Hameed is working for Voice of America (Urdu).

Awards and recognition

References

Pakistani television people
Living people
Year of birth missing (living people)
Recipients of the Pride of Performance
Pakistani television newsreaders and news presenters
People from Rawalpindi